The 2017 Norfolk State Spartans football team represented Norfolk State University in the 2017 NCAA Division I FCS football season. They were led by third-year head coach Latrell Scott and played their home games at William "Dick" Price Stadium. They were a member of the Mid-Eastern Athletic Conference (MEAC). They finished the season 4–7, 4–4 in MEAC play to finish in sixth place.

Schedule

Source: Schedule

Game summaries

Virginia State

William & Mary

at James Madison

at Delaware State

Florida A&M

Hampton

at North Carolina Central

Savannah State

North Carolina A&T

at Howard

at Morgan State

References

Norfolk State
Norfolk State Spartans football seasons
Norfolk State Spartans football